JW Bolton was an Australian bus bodybuilder in Perth.

History
In 1972, John Bolton, the son of Boltons owner Keith, formed JW Bolton. It initially manufactured fire engines, before moving into bus bodying completing bodies on Leyland B21, MAN SG292H, Mercedes-Benz O305 and O305G, and Renault 100.2 and 180.2 chassis for Transperth.

In 1983, a batch of Mercedes-Benz O303 coaches were bodied by Ansair for Westrail with JW Bolton completing the fitout.

References

External links
Bus Australia gallery

Bus manufacturers of Australia
Australian companies established in 1972
Australian companies disestablished in 1989